Gowell is both a surname and a given name. Notable people with the name include:

Larry Gowell (1948–2020), American baseball player
Gowell Claset (1907–1981), American baseball player

See also
Cowell (surname)
Powell (surname)